Henri de Wet (born 1 March 1962) is a former professional tennis player from South Africa.

Biography
Born in Klerksdorp, de Wet attended college in the United States in the early 1980s, at the University of Miami. He played on the same tennis team at the University of Miami as countryman Christo Steyn. In 1983 he turned professional and won a Challenger title that year in Vigo, Spain. In addition to two Grand Prix main draw appearances in Johannesburg, de Wet also appeared at the Austrian Open Kitzbühel in 1984 and the 1985 Cincinnati Open. At the Bloemfontein Challenger tournament in 1987 he had a win over future world number one Jim Courier.

Having immigrated to Germany, he now lives in Düsseldorf.

Challenger titles

Singles: (1)

References

External links
 
 
 

1962 births
Living people
South African male tennis players
Miami Hurricanes men's tennis players
People from Klerksdorp
South African emigrants to Germany